Reginald Perkins (April 29, 1955 – January 22, 2009) was an American serial killer who is believed to have murdered up to six women in Ohio and Texas between 1980 and 2000. Convicted of the December 2000 murder of his stepmother, Perkins was sentenced to death and executed via lethal injection. While in prison, DNA evidence linked him to two other murders in Fort Worth in 1991, and he is suspected of killing a further three women in Ohio in the 1980s whom he was acquainted with.

Early life
Perkins was born on April 29, 1955, in Woodruff County, Arkansas. He left Arkansas at a young age and grew up in Texas. In the 1970s, he moved to Cleveland, Ohio to be closer to his mother. He worked several jobs as a laborer, plumber, and truck driver.

Murders

Ohio
In 1979, Perkins began dating Ramola Nelson Washington, who moved out of her home to live with him in 1980. On April 4, 1980, Perkins raped a 12-year-old girl in an abandoned house located on the East Side of Cleveland. The girl was a friend of his younger sister. Months later, Washington asked Perkins to return a set of keys to her sister, 21-year-old Paula Nelson. Five days later, on October 23, 1980, Nelson was found strangled to death in her bedroom in Cleveland. According to Washington, a few days before Nelson's body was found, she had overheard Perkins talking to his brother about Nelson and that something had happened to her.

On December 13, 1980, Perkins attempted to rape another 12-year-old girl, who was the daughter of a neighbor of his. Perkins was stopped before carrying out the attack but warned that he would kill anyone who learned about the assault. On January 4, 1981, the body of 43-year-old Jennie Morman was found in her apartment. She had been strangled to death with a scarf, and her face was covered with two pillows. Perkins had been dating Morman's daughter with whom he later had a child with. On January 23, 1981, Jerry Dean Thomas, Perkins's neighbor and the mother of the 12-year-old girl he had attempted to rape, was found strangled to death. Her body was located in her basement, and she had been strangled to death with a hairdryer cord. Days before her murder she had learned about the attempted rape of her daughter by Perkins.

Perkins was questioned about the murders by Cleveland police. On November 12, 1981, Perkins was convicted of the April 1980 rape and December 1980 attempted rape of both 12-year-old girls in Cleveland. He was sentenced to life in prison. There was not enough evidence at the time, however, to link him to the three murders.

Texas
In 1990, Perkins was paroled and moved to Fort Worth, Texas. On May 6, 1991, the bodies of 79-year-old Hattie Wilson and her niece, 44-year-old Shirley Douglas, were found inside Wilson's apartment in Fort Worth. Both had been strangled to death. At the time, Perkins had been dating the granddaughter of Wilson. In 1993, Perkins returned to prison in Ohio for failing to attend classes for sex offenders. In 1999, an Ohio court classified him as a sexual predator. In 2000, Perkins was paroled and went back to Texas to work as a truck driver for his father and stepmother's company.

On December 4, 2000, 64-year-old Gertie Mae Perkins, Reginald's stepmother, failed to collect her grandson from school. As such, she was reported missing. Her home was searched, and police discovered a disconnected phone, carpet removed from the floor, and several missing sheets. The same day, Perkins pawned a wedding ring that belonged to her. Perkins was arrested for failing to register as a sex offender a day later. Perkins was questioned by police due to his history and led authorities to Gertie's car, where her body was found in the vehicle's trunk.

Trial and revelation
Perkins was indicted and tried in Tarrant County. Because of his history, the prosecution attempted to seek the death penalty. They brought in witnesses to testify about the three unsolved murder cases in Cleveland and how Perkins was the likely perpetrator. According to Ramola Washington, Perkins called her from jail and admitted murdering her sister Paula Nelson back in 1980. She claimed he had begged for her forgiveness. While awaiting trial, Perkins allegedly confessed to another inmate that he had killed Gertie and beaten her to death before robbing her.

Ultimately, Perkins was found guilty of murder. On March 4, 2002, Perkins was convicted of the capital murder of Gertie Mae Perkins. On March 22, 2002, he was sentenced to death.

In November 2008, DNA tests linked Perkins to the May 1991 murders of Wilson and Douglas in Fort Worth, proving his guilt in those killings.

Execution
On January 22, 2009, Perkins was executed via lethal injection at the Huntsville Unit in Huntsville, Texas. He was pronounced dead at 6:24 p.m. About an hour before his execution was due, he called a prison official to his cell and gave him a statement in which he proclaimed his innocence. Kevin Rousseau, the attorney who prosecuted Perkins, said he was nothing more than "a consummate liar and a con artist."

See also
 Capital punishment in Texas
 Capital punishment in the United States
 List of people executed in Texas, 2000–2009
 List of people executed in the United States in 2009
 List of serial killers in the United States

References

1955 births
2009 deaths
20th-century American criminals
21st-century executions by Texas
21st-century executions of American people
American male criminals
American people convicted of rape
American people convicted of attempted rape
Executed American serial killers
Executed people from Arkansas
People executed by Texas by lethal injection
People from Woodruff County, Arkansas